Rugby Union Donau Wien is an Austrian rugby club in Vienna.

History
The club was founded in 1989 as a youth team of RC Wien. Later that year they won the first Austrian Youth Championships, which they won again in 1991. As the players grew older, they progressed to the RC Wien senior team.

They merged with RC Wien in 1999, although Wien had separate teams up until 2002.

Honours

RC Wien
 Bundesliga
 1993, 1995, 1996, 1997, 1998, 1999, 2000, 2001, 2002
 Austro-Moravia Cup
 1997, 1998

Rugby Union Donau Wien

2013/2014
 Staatsmeister Bundesliga
 Austrian Sevens Championships Woman

2012/2013
 Staatsmeister Bundesliga
 Austrian Sevens Championships Woman

2011/2012
 Staatsmeister Bundesliga
 Austrian Sevens Championships Woman

2010/2011
 Staatsmeister Bundesliga
 Austrian Sevens Championships Woman

2009/2010
 Staatsmeister Bundesliga
 Austrian Sevens Championships Woman

2008/2009
 Staatsmeister Bundesliga
 Austrian Sevens Championships Woman

2007/2008
 Staatsmeister Bundesliga
 Austrian Sevens Championships Woman

2006/2007
 Staatsmeister Bundesliga
 Austrian Sevens Championships Woman

2005/2006
Staatsmeister Bundesliga
 Austrian Sevens Championships Woman

2004/2005
 Staatsmeister Bundesliga
 Austrian Sevens Championships Woman
 Bundesliga
 2003, 2004, 2005, 2006
 Austrian Sevens Championships
 2008, 2010

External links

Austrian rugby union teams
Rugby clubs established in 1989
Sport in Vienna
1989 establishments in Austria